Atahar Kamal Musalman is a Nepali politician and member of the House of Representatives of the federal parliament of Nepal, elected under the proportional representation system from Nepali Congress. In the previous parliament, he was elected as an independent lawmaker. He withdrew from the vice presidential race two hours after filing his candidacy, in support of the Nepali Congress candidate, in 2015.

References

Living people
Nepal MPs 2017–2022
Nepali Congress politicians from Lumbini Province
Members of the 2nd Nepalese Constituent Assembly
1970 births